The molecular formula C21H21ClO11 (molar mass: 484.84 g/mol, exact mass: 484.0772 u) may refer to:

 Chrysanthemin chloride (Cyanidin 3-O-glucoside chloride)
 Ideain chloride (Cyanidin 3-O-galactoside chloride)

Molecular formulas